This is a list of electoral results for the Electoral division of Barkly in Northern Territory elections.

Members for Barkly

Election results

Elections in the 1970s

 The number of votes each independent candidate received is unknown.

Elections in the 1980s

 Preferences were not distributed.

 This election was declared void by the Court of Disputed Returns.

 Percentages compared to 1983 election.

Elections in the 1990s

 Percentages compared to 1987 by-election.

Elections in the 2000s

Elections in the 2010s

Elections in the 2020s

References

Northern Territory electoral results by district